Eoconstrictor is an extinct genus of boid snake, which supposedly had infrared vision, from the Eocene of Germany (Messel Pit). The type species, E. fischeri is known from multiple well-preserved specimens found in the Messel Pit of Germany. It was originally named as Palaeopython fischeri by Stephan Schaal in 2004, but examination of the genus showed that it represented a distinct lineage; it was renamed as the new genus Eoconstrictor in 2020.

References 

Boidae
Eocene snakes
Fossils of Germany
Fossil taxa described in 2020
Prehistoric reptile genera